William Dean Howe (12 January 1916 – 24 June 1982) was a New Democratic Party member of the House of Commons of Canada. He was born in Toronto, Ontario and became a physician by career.

Howe was first elected at the Hamilton South riding in the 1963 general election, after an unsuccessful attempt to win a seat there in the 1962 election. After re-election to a second term at Hamilton South in the 1965 election, riding changes by the 1968 election meant that Howe campaigned in the Hamilton Mountain riding. He was defeated in the 1968 federal election by Gordon J. Sullivan of the Liberal Party and did not stand for election again.

External links
 

1916 births
1982 deaths
Members of the House of Commons of Canada from Ontario
New Democratic Party MPs
Politicians from Toronto